is a Japanese arcade game musician and programmer. He has composed the following scores for arcade games:

Flying Shark
Tiger-Heli
Guardian 
Hellfire
Twin Cobra
Out Zone
Dogyuun
Zero Wing (with Toshiaki Tomisawa and Masahiro Yuge)

After Toaplan closed in 1994, Uemura joined the Toaplan offshoot company Gazelle, and served as director of the 1996 shooter Air Gallet (Akuu Gallet; distributed by Banpresto). In 1999, he worked for 8ing/Raizing as a programmer for the shooter Battle Bakraid (a follow-up to 1996's Battle Garegga).

In 2000, his music for Zero Wing was sampled by the band, The Laziest Men on Mars, and resulted in "All your base are belong to us", an Internet phenomenon / meme that was popular in the early 2000s.

External links
Homepage in japanese
CDs with Uemura's music
Artist profile at OverClocked ReMix

1960 births
Japanese composers
Japanese male composers
Japanese male musicians
Living people
Musicians from Hyōgo Prefecture
Video game composers